Utsav Rock Garden is an Indoor and Outdoor Sculpture Museum located at Gotagodi, Shiggaon Taluk at Haveri district in Karnataka, India. The  
Garden consists of live-sculptures depicting the North Karnataka culture. Various murals, all which are hand-crafted are arranged in a prosaic manner.

Village life of yesteryear North Karnataka is showcased at Utsav Art Garden. Along with murals related to Agriculture, various Artisans of Villages like Weavers, Handicraft workers, Lambani Artists and such are placed at the Garden.
There's a small lake, with Boat-Rides. Food options include the local flavor of Jowar Roti,palya, assortment of chutney powders, curds, bhutti, holige and other Indian varieties.

Utsav Rock Garden India is a sculptural garden near Gotagodi, Shiggaon Taluk, Haveri District, Karnataka, India. It features the contemporary art and rural culture of North Karnataka. It features more than a thousand sculptures, including the sculptural recreation of a typical art village depicting the labors of traditional craftsmen and artisans. 

It is a place blended with modern and contemporary art which portrays our old generation, their life style, culture, plays, professions, costume etc. "Utsav" the word itself defines the meaning festival. It is not only a leisure park but a hub of art, culture and education. It is the inimitable rock garden in the whole world. It has also got 8 prestigious awards.  At the entrance, you will see a mudded hill with beehive and wheels of time. Move the wheels of time away and walk inside to see our ancestors’ traditional and cultural life which was calm and healthy. You feel yourself as if you are in 1920s. As you enter the rock garden, Kannada veteran actor Dr. Rajkumar's hit films’ sculptures are shown.  Dr. Rajkumar's roles like Mayor  Muttanna, Bedar Kannappa, Sanadi Appanna, Satya Harischandra, Huliya Halina Mevu, Bahaddur Gandu, Akasmika, Santa Tukarama, Raghavendra Swamy are on display.

Small children with different poses are shown. One child is seeing towards sky and praying the god, other child signifies the famous quote - see no evil, hear no evil, speak no evil.  The tree with sprinkling water, a place is given for birds shows the policy of live and let live.

There is an indoor modern art museum in the garden with a wide variety of art made from pearls that are painted on glass.

The Marriage Hall is one of the places of the garden. Indoor marriage hall seems to be a real marriage ceremony going on and people are busy posing for the camera. The clicking sound of camera adds to the feeling of real marriage ambience. Look around; there are marriages rituals of all religions are photographed on all walls.  In model cow shed, different breeds of real size cows and buffaloes are brilliantly designed.

Enter the pre-independence era, see your ancestors, and watch their lifestyle, notice their working culture have fun in this beautiful. This village is an artist's expression depicting our earlier generations. Sculptures of listening astrology, weighing grocery item, reading news paper, waving hand, combing hair are awesome. . This park gives a glimpse into the lifestyle of our fore fathers or ancestors.

Gouda's home is fabulous. Gouda sitting with an audacious style, a helper is standing near him as if he is obeying his orders; a dog sitting near the Gouda shows the vibes of real Gouda's house. This is really a new thing to our siblings who carry an android phone with them always. They do not know all these traditions, customs, and cultures. Globalization has attracted the rural youths towards metropolitans, thus the rural professions took a new look. Left are few which are under threat.
Other sculptures portrays old transport system, Buffaloes fighting, old plays like Goli gunda, Gilli danda will take you to your own creative and imaginative world where you feel and experience those unforgettable old days. Many more sculptures are waiting to take a trim shape.

The man behind this great venture is Dr T. B Solabakkanavar, a renowned artist who got many awards. Shri Solabakkanavar, recipient of awards such as the Karnataka Janapada & Yakshagana Academy Award, Karnataka Rajyotsava Award, and Karnataka Lalithakala Academy Honorary Award, conceived and designed the garden. Sree Prakash Dasanur from Dasanur Groups joined hands with him to build this international standard rock garden.

These are the some main highlights of the garden. There is lot more to see and enjoy. "Here there is no full stop to the art, it will always have comma in this garden" says its main designer and architect Prof T.B. Solabakkanavar.  He is a person with big motto and aims who have made this world-class park. It has also got 8 prestigious awards. 

History: In the earlier stage the whole place was an open ground. Solabakkanavar and his team always thought the about it. He had the inner feeling to do something to his village. Once a dead cow was seen in the area. The artists thought to design a cow like this. They made it so beautifully that a real cow dashed at it as if it is its enemy. When an animal is attracted and though that cow as the real one, what will be the people's reaction. Then they started designing various types of sculptures. 
They thought about designing a village, which is unknown our siblings. A village, its ambiance, professions (cobbler, weaver, shopkeeper, tailor, potter, goldsmith, blacksmith, school teacher etc.), their daily life, their costumes and the list goes on. All the ideas turned into reality and they have come so very well that at the first sight you feel them as real ones.

Prof T.B. Salabakkanavar has taught this art to students who are now working in different parts of the country.  Still countless students are learning this art. This is a unique art which will make you feel as if the animals or humans are present in front of you and busy doing something. Bringing the expressions out through cement and paint is not an easy task. This artists’ team has proved it. Kudos to Prof T.B. Solabakkanavar for giving such a rare and a unique rock garden to North Karnataka. We feel proud to say that it is in North Karnataka.

There is no rock garden like this in the whole world. This is a unique one with the international standards. No artist in the worlds has designed these (hand-made, not molded) countless sculptures through cement and paint. The most fascinating point is the whole garden will never expose you to the sun light, you will move in garden shade across the park without any barriers to your amusement.

How to reach
Utsav Rock Garden is at Gotagodi – on NH4. It is just 30 minutes drive from Hubli. If you are driving from Hubli, it will be on your right-side after Folklore University. 
If you are coming from Bangalore, It will be on your left side, just 5 km after shiggaon taluk in Haveri District. 
The garden is opened on all weekdays from morning 9.30 am to 6.30 pm. Tea, coffee stalls, Jowar Roti Meals, Bakery Items, Ice creams, cold drinks are available inside the garden. 
Go boating with your loved ones to freshen up with our topped and un-topped pedal boats inside the garden. There are canteens to savor delicious food, coffee, tea or cold drinks and north Karnataka Roti utta too.

Folk Resort Stay is also available at Indian Garden a Unit of Utsav Rock Garden Resort at http://www.indiangarden.org

Indian Garden offers wide variety of entertainment games an amusement park activities like Musical Rain Dance, Water sliding, Water Balloon Pool,  Horse-Tanga and Bullock-Cart Rides, Folk costumes a very attractive tourist place of Karnataka including tasty food court which serves authentic delicacies from North Karnataka at Hotel Raj inside Utsav Rock Garden Premises

References

Official site

Rock gardens in India
Tourist attractions in Karnataka
Buildings and structures in Haveri district
Sculpture gardens, trails and parks in India